Isabel Sanford (born Eloise Gwendolyn Sanford; August 29, 1917 – July 9, 2004) was an American stage, film, and television actress and comedian best known for her role as Louise "Weezy" Mills Jefferson on the CBS sitcoms All in the Family (1971–1975) and The Jeffersons (1975–1985). In 1981, she became the second African-American actress to win a Primetime Emmy Award after Gail Fisher, and so far, the only African-American actress to win for Outstanding Lead Actress in a Comedy Series.

Early life
Sanford was born Eloise Gwendolyn Sanford in Harlem, New York City, to Josephine (née Perry) and James Edward Sanford. She was the youngest of seven children and was the only child to survive beyond infancy. Sanford's mother Josephine was devoutly religious and insisted that her daughter attend church every Sunday, and occasionally made her attend on weeknights. As a teenager, Sanford aspired to be an actress, but her mother discouraged her dream, as she felt that show business was "the road to degradation." Sanford disobeyed her mother and began performing at local clubs. She also performed at amateur night at The Apollo Theater. After graduating high school, Sanford joined Harlem's American Negro Theater and The Star Players. She made her professional stage debut in 1946 in On Strivers Row, and appeared in several off-Broadway productions while also working as a keypunch operator at IBM. Sanford married house painter William Edward "Sonny" Richmond, with whom she had three children. Their marriage was tumultuous, and they later separated.

Career
After separating from her husband, Sanford and her three children relocated to California in 1960. Soon after her arrival, she was asked to join the national production of Here Today by actress Tallulah Bankhead. In 1965, she made her Broadway debut in James Baldwin's The Amen Corner.  This role led to her being cast in the 1967 film Guess Who's Coming to Dinner. In the film, she was credited as Isabell Sanford, playing the role of the maid "Tillie Binks," and earned her good reviews. She caught the attention of major Hollywood players, including Norman Lear, who cast Sanford in the role of Louise Jefferson in All in the Family. Sanford and her TV husband Sherman Hemsley were so popular that Norman Lear decided to spin off the characters into their own weekly series The Jeffersons. Sanford was initially reluctant to commit to working on a weekly series, as she was already working steadily, but decided to accept the offer. The Jeffersons premiered in January 1975, and was an immediate hit with audiences, ultimately running for 11 seasons. For her role in the series, Sanford earned five Golden Globe Award nominations and seven Primetime Emmy Award nominations. She won a Primetime Emmy Award for Outstanding Lead Actress in a Comedy Series in 1981, making her the first African-American actress to win in that category.

After The Jeffersons''' cancellation in 1985, Sanford continued her career with guest-starring roles in television and film. In January 1987, she starred in her own sitcom, Isabel's Honeymoon Hotel, which aired five days a week in syndication. The series was created to showcase Sanford's comedic skills, but it failed to attract an audience and was quickly cancelled. In the 1990s, Sanford mainly appeared in television guest appearances and cameo appearances in movies. She appeared on Dream On, Living Single, Hangin' with Mr. Cooper, In the House, Lois & Clark: The New Adventures of Superman, The Steve Harvey Show, and Hearts Are Wild. In 1996, she played a supporting role in the action movie Original Gangstas, starring blaxploitation film stars Fred Williamson, Pam Grier, Jim Brown, and Richard Roundtree.

Sanford later reprised her role as Louise Jefferson in a touring company of The Real Live Jeffersons stage show in the mid-1990s alongside Sherman Hemsley. Hemsley and she also made a cameo appearance in the film Sprung, and guest-starred in The Parkers, Mafia!, and two episodes of The Fresh Prince of Bel-Air. The two also appeared in a series of advertisements for Denny's and Old Navy. In January 2004, Sanford received a star on the Hollywood Walk of Fame for her contribution to the television industry. She made her final television appearance the following month as an animated version of herself in The Simpsons'' episode "Milhouse Doesn't Live Here Anymore."

Personal life
Sanford was married to house painter William Edward "Sonny" Richmond. The couple had three children—two sons (including Sanford K. Richmond) and a daughter (Pamela Richmond Ruff) before separating. After their separation, Sanford and the children moved to California in 1960, while Richmond remained in New York. Shortly after their arrival, Richmond died after being involved in an altercation. Sanford was a Democrat who attended an event with Dennis Weaver for presidential candidate Jesse Jackson in 1988.

Death
In September 2003, Sanford underwent preventive surgery on her carotid artery. In the ensuing months, her health steadily declined. She was hospitalized at Cedars-Sinai Medical Center on July 4, 2004, where she died five days later—a month before her 87th birthday. Her publicist attributed it to unspecified natural causes. She was interred at Forest Lawn Memorial Park, Hollywood Hills in Los Angeles. For her contribution to the television industry, Isabel Sanford has a star on the Hollywood Walk of Fame located at 7080 Hollywood Boulevard.

Broadway credits

Filmography

Awards and nominations

References

External links

1917 births
2004 deaths
20th-century American actresses
21st-century American actresses
Actresses from New York City
African-American actresses
American film actresses
American stage actresses
American television actresses
American voice actresses
Burials at Forest Lawn Memorial Park (Hollywood Hills)
Outstanding Performance by a Lead Actress in a Comedy Series Primetime Emmy Award winners
People from Harlem
California Democrats
New York (state) Democrats
20th-century African-American women
20th-century African-American people
21st-century African-American women